Chhor (Sindhi: ڇور) is a town situated in Umerkot District, Sindh, Pakistan. It lies on the Mirpur Khas-Jodhpur railway line. Umarkot is on West, Sanghar is on north, Khokharapar is on East and Badin and Mithi Districts at south. It is start of Thar Desert which further touches the Indian border on East. The Pakistan army school of desert warfare is located here.

Climate

Chhor has a hot desert climate (Köppen climate classification BWh) with very hot summers and warm winters. The main rainfall is in the monsoon season, which lasts from June to September.

References 

Populated places in Umerkot District

mr:खोखरापार